Gibbosporina sphaerospora is a species of foliose lichen in the family Pannariaceae. It was described as a new species in 2016 by Arve Elvebakk and Soon Gyu Hong. The type was collected from Millaa Millaa Falls in Queensland, Australia, where it was found growing on fallen branches in a remnant rainforest near the falls. The specific epithet sphaerospora, which combines the Greek sphaero ("globose") with spora, refers to the spherical shape of the spores. The lichen occurs in Australia, Fiji, and Papua New Guinea.

References

sphaerospora
Lichen species
Lichens of Australia
Lichens of New Guinea
Lichens of Oceania
Lichens described in 2016
Taxa named by Arve Elvebakk